Imerovigli (also Merovigli) is the highest mountain of the Greek island Othoni, located in the Diapontia Islands in Ionian Sea, northwest of Corfu. It is about 2 km from the settlement Chorio. It has a height that exceeds 390 meters and is accessible by a traditional path (~ 1300 meters long) leading to the top of the mountain where every visitor can observe the view of the Ionian and Adriatic sea.

References

Mountains of Greece
Ionian Islands
Othonoi